Saccolabium is a genus of flowering plants from the orchid family, Orchidaceae. It is native to India and Indonesia. In the past, over 350 names have been published for species, subspecies and varieties within the genus, but the vast majority of the taxa have been moved to other genera. At present (June 2014), the following are accepted in Saccolabium:

Saccolabium congestum (Lindl.) Hook.f. - India
Saccolabium longicaule J.J.Sm. - Java
Saccolabium pusillum Blume - Java, Sumatra
Saccolabium rantii J.J.Sm. - Java
Saccolabium sigmoideum J.J.Sm. - Java

See also 
 List of Orchidaceae genera

References

External links 
 

Vandeae genera
Aeridinae
Orchids of Asia